Cajita may refer to:

Eschweilera mexicana, a species of woody plant only found  in Mexico
Cajita (instrument), a Latin percussion instrument in which a little box is opened and closed
A subset of the JavaScript programming language based on the principles of object-capabilities, see Caja project